The 2021–22 season is St Mirren's 4th consecutive season in the top tier of Scottish football since being promoted from the Scottish Championship at the end of the 2017–18 season. The club will also participate in the League Cup and Scottish Cup.

Season summary
St Mirren began the season under the management of Jim Goodwin in his second full season at the club. In July 2021, St Mirren announced that they would now be a fan-owned club after chairman Gordon Scott agreed to sell his majority shareholding to the St Mirren Independent Supporters Association (SMISA). John Needham was then appointed as the new chairman of the club. On 19 February, Jim Goodwin would leave his position as manager to take up the vacant manager's position at Aberdeen. On 22 February, former Motherwell manager Stephen Robinson was appointed as the club's new manager on a two-and-a-half-year deal.

Competitions

Results and fixtures

Scottish Premiership

Scottish League Cup

Group stage

Knockout round

Scottish Cup

Player statistics

Appearances and goals

|-
|colspan="12"|Players who left the club during the 2021–22 season
|-

|}

Goal scorers

Disciplinary record
Includes all competitive matches.
Last updated 15 May 2022

Team statistics

League table

Division summary

League Cup table

Transfers

Players in

Players out

References

St Mirren F.C. seasons
St Mirren